Roller skating and roller hockey were contested at the 1995 Pan American Games, held in Mar del Plata, Argentina.

Roller skating

Men's events
Speed

Artistic

Women's events
Speed

Artistic

Mixed events

Roller hockey

Men

Medal table

References

Events at the 1995 Pan American Games
1995
1995 Pan American Games
1995 in roller sports